Al compás de tu mentira is a 1950 black-and-white Argentine musical film directed by Héctor Canziani. The film was adapted from Oscar Wilde's 1895 play The Importance of Being Earnest by Abel Santacruz. The film starred Francisco Álvarez and Pedro Quartucci.

The film is based on tango dancing, an integral part of the culture of Buenos Aires.

Cast

 Francisco Álvarez
 Anaclara Bell
 Jorge Casal
 Alfredo De Angelis
 Delfy de Ortega
 Domingo Federico
 Héctor Gagliardi
 Ramón Garay
 Herminia Llorente
 Osmar Maderna
 Lalo Maura
 Margarita Palacios
 Pedro Quartucci
 Irma Roy
 Olga Vilmar

Release 
The film premiered on 22 March 1950.

External links
 

1950 films
Argentine musical films
Argentine black-and-white films
1950s Spanish-language films
Tango films
1950 musical films
Films based on The Importance of Being Earnest
Films with screenplays by Abel Santa Cruz
1950s Argentine films